Kudu-Byas (Kudu Bes) is a rural locality (a selo) in Neryuktyayinsky 1-y Rural Okrug of Olyokminsky District in the Sakha Republic, Russia, located  from Olyokminsk, the administrative center of the district, and  from Neryuktyayinsk 1-y, the administrative center of the rural okrug. Its population as of the 2010 Census was 2, down from 5 recorded during the 2002 Census.

References

Notes

Sources
Official website of the Sakha Republic. Registry of the Administrative-Territorial Divisions of the Sakha Republic. Olyokminsky District. 

Rural localities in Olyokminsky District